The Truth About Murder is a 1946 American mystery film directed by Lew Landers, written by Lawrence Kimble, Hilda Gordon and Eric Taylor, and starring Bonita Granville, Morgan Conway, Rita Corday, Don Douglas and June Clayworth. It was released on July 26, 1946, by RKO Pictures.

Plot

Christine Allen administers lie detector tests for the district attorney, Les Ashton, but wants to become a prosecutor in court. Frustrated, she leaves Les to work for lawyer Bill Crane, whose unhappy wife Marsha, a photographer, makes large bets with bookie Johnny Lacka and openly flirts with model Peggy's husband.

Les is in love with Chris and wants her back. He fools Bill into believing Marsha wants to reconcile, but instead Paul Marvin turns up, telling Bill he and Marsha have become romantically involved. Marsha then is found dead. Les and the police naturally suspect Bill.

Lacka refuses to pay the $20,000 that Marsha won with her bet. Peggy is then killed. At a party, Chris convinces her guests to take one of her lie detector tests. From the answers she gets, she deduces that Paul is the killer behind it all. She is saved from being his next victim by Les, with whom she is now in love.

Cast 
Bonita Granville as Christine Allen
Morgan Conway as Dist. Atty. Lester Ashton
Rita Corday as Peggy
Don Douglas as Paul Marvin 
June Clayworth as Marsha Crane
Edward Norris as William Ames Crane
Gerald Mohr as Johnny Lacka
Michael St. Angel as Hank 
Tommy Noonan as Jonesy

References

External links 
 

1946 films
American black-and-white films
RKO Pictures films
Films directed by Lew Landers
1946 mystery films
American mystery films
Films scored by Leigh Harline
1940s English-language films
1940s American films